The Republic of Poland Ambassador to China is the official representative of the Government of Poland to the Government of the People's Republic of China.

The Embassy of Poland, China is located in Beijing. In addition there are Consulates General located in Chengdu, Hong Kong, Guangzhou and Shanghai.

List of Ambassadors

References 

 
China
Poland